William Gonzalo Gutiérrez Cabrera  (born March 29, 1963 in Palmitas) is a retired Uruguayan footballer.

International career
Gutiérrez made seven appearances for the senior Uruguay national football team during 1991.

References

 

1963 births
Living people
People from Soriano Department
Uruguayan footballers
Uruguay international footballers
1991 Copa América players
El Tanque Sisley players
Central Español players
Club Nacional de Football players
C.A. Progreso players
Defensor Sporting players
Atlético Junior footballers
Deportes Temuco footballers
Uruguayan Primera División players
Chilean Primera División players
Primera B de Chile players
Expatriate footballers in Chile
Expatriate footballers in Colombia

Association football forwards